de Oliveira, Oliveira and d'Oliveira are surnames found mainly in Brazil and Portugal, and to a lesser extent in former Portuguese and Spanish colonies. In Portuguese, 'de Oliveira' means 'of the Olive Tree' and/or 'from the Olive Tree'.

'de Oliveira' is also a Sephardic surname, used prior to the start of the Portuguese Inquisition as a way for Jews to avoid prosecution and under torture to become new Catholics. Since those people were targeted, and since Portugal had just recently discovered Brazil (1500), many of those people fled to Brazil and other colonies of Portugal.

Similar names in other languages include the Italian Olivetti and Oliveto.

Origin of the surname

The surname identifies this family with the Olive Tree and the symbolic characteristics existing on the tree. On the coats of arms where it appears, it is the symbol of peace, of victory, of fame and immortal glory. In archaic Portuguese we find the register of surnames with variations of their spelling, such as Olveira and Ulveira. By the time of King Diniz I, king of Portugal in 1281, Oliveira was already "an old, illustrious and honorable family," as the king's books of Inquisitions show.

‘Oliveira’ is classified in the genealogical-Jewish study as of proven Jewish origin. Before the Inquisition the “de Oliveira” where also in Spain. Before the Islamist conquered the Iberian peninsula it was called ‘ha-Levi’ or ‘ha-Itshari'.
‘De Oliveira’ who settled in Portugal, Galicia and Spain, adopted a translated form of their family name to disguise their Judean origin. And as according to USP historian Anita Novinsky – world authority in Portuguese Inquisition – 1 out of every 3 Portuguese who arrived in Brazil in the first decades of the 16th century after the discovery of Brazil by Pedro Alvares Cabral (he himself a new christian and member of the Order of Christ a Knights Templar order made exclusively of Judeans) were new Christians well over 2 million during the entire 16th century. The ‘de Oliveira’ and their cousins Benveniste and Antunes arrived largely and concentrated mainly in the Northeast Region and Minas Gerais State in southeast Brazil.

The chronicles of the time themselves attest to the presence of Levi, Levy and de Oliveira families in large numbers in colonial Brazil. Rabbi Abraham Benveniste who was born in 1433, in the city of Soria, in the province of Cáceres, in the Kingdom of Spain adopted the 'De Oliveira' family name in Portugal. He was a direct descendant of Rabbi Zerahiá ben-Its'haq ha-Levi and Gerona, who lived in the 12th century and was called ha-Its'hari, or Its'hari, because his genealogy goes to the children of Its'har, who was uncle of the prophet Moshe Rabenu. 'De Oliveira' became internally among Judeans of the Diaspora the family name to be used exclusively by Judeans who could still trace and prove their genealogy to the tribe of Levy and to Judeans could trace and prove they were direct offspring of hebronites so both the priesthood and royal lineage took 'De Oliveira' so they could be later traced. They were also allowed to marry only among Levites and Hebronites themselves following biblical paternal lineage.

The offspring of the tribe of Levy and Hebron intentionally settled between Spain Galicia and Portugal for two reasons, first because it is inland and far from the great centers of Spain, where the first killings of Judeans or pogroms began, promoted by fanatical Catholic priests of the Dominican and Carmelite orders, which urged the ignorant old Christian population to kill the New Christian Jews and the unconverted Judeans and also gave them freedom to cross the borders among the different countries accordingly to the laws of each State.

Toponymic
"Oliveira" is the Olive Tree that represented the nation of Israel as their Hebronite priestly and royal lineage and also for the olive oil itself that was used by the Levites to light the Menorah. Also the phoneme of the Latin letters, whose sounds represented the sound or phoneme of the Hebrew name Levy in the L-V-Y case. And it crossed their minds that in Semitic languages such as Hebrew, Aramaic, Arabic, and Amharic of Ethiopia, they do not use vowels in the written form of these languages, but only consonants. It was because of these linguistic mechanisms adopted by the Sephardim that many Judean families managed to escape the attacks of the Inquisition until they at least managed to escape the Iberian Peninsula.

People with the surname

General
A. H. de Oliveira Marques (1933–2007), Portuguese historian
Adriano Correia de Oliveira (1942–1982), Portuguese musician
Alberto de Oliveira (1857–1937), Brazilian poet
Antônio Castilho de Alcântara Machado de Oliveira (1901–1935), Brazilian writer
Anthony William Garotinho Matheus de Oliveira (born 1960), Brazilian politician
António de Oliveira Salazar (1889–1970), Portuguese statesman and long-time prime minister
António Manuel de Oliveira Guterres (born 1949), Portuguese politician and former prime minister
Arnaldo de Oliveira Sales (1920–2020), Hong Kong businessman
Augusto Oliveira Moreira (1896–2009), Portuguese supercentenarian
Brother Carlos Oliveira (born 1989), Christian exorcist and deliverance minister
Carlos de Oliveira (1921–1981), Portuguese poet and novelist
Carlos Roberto de Oliveira (1954–2023), Brazilian politician
César de Oliveira (born 1977), Portuguese composer
Christianne Oliveira (born 1981), Brazilian actress
Dalva de Oliveira (1917–1972), Brazilian singer
Daniel de Oliveira (disambiguation), several people
Domingos Oliveira (1873–1957), Portuguese politician and general
Elmar Oliveira (born 1950), American violinist
Fernanda Oliveira (born 1980), Brazilian ballet dancer
Filipe Oliveira Dias (1963–2014), Portuguese architect
Flavia de Oliveira (born 1983), Brazilian supermodel
Florisvaldo de Oliveira (1958–2012), Brazilian serial killer and former police officer
Francisco Oliveira (born 1965), Brazilian entertainer and politician
Ghaya Oliveira, Tunisian-born chef
Hélio de Oliveira Santos (born 1950), Brazilian physician and politician
Hélio Lourenço de Oliveira (1917–1985), Brazilian physician, and academic
Ingrid Oliveira (born 1996), Brazilian competitive diver
Jair Oliveira (born 1975), Brazilian composer, singer and producer
João Baptista de Oliveira Figueiredo (1918–1999), Brazilian military leader and politician
João Francisco de Saldanha Oliveira e Daun (1790–1876), Portuguese marshal and statesman
João Marques de Oliveira (1853–1927), Portuguese painter
Joaquim Pedro de Oliveira Martins (1845–1894), Portuguese writer
José Alberto de Oliveira Anchieta (1832–1897), Portuguese explorer and naturalist
Juca da Oliveira (born 1935), Brazilian actor
Juscelino Kubitschek de Oliveira (1902–1976), Brazilian politician and president of Brazil
Luiz Eduardo de Oliveira (born 1944), Brazilian comics creator
Manoel de Oliveira (1908–2015), Portuguese film director
Manuel de Oliveira Gomes da Costa (1863–1929), Portuguese army officer and politician, former President of the Republic 
Nathan Oliveira (1928–2010), American painter, printmaker, and sculptor
Nereu de Oliveira (1888–1958), Brazilian political figure
Nilo de Oliveira Guimarães (born 1954), São Toméan businessman and politician
Paola Oliveira (born 1982), Brazilian actress
Paulo Setúbal de Oliveira (1893–1937), Brazilian writer
Plinio Corrêa de Oliveira (1908–1995), Brazilian historian and politician
Phillippe de Oliveira (died 1627), the conqueror of Jaffna kingdom
Raica Oliveira (born 1984), Brazilian model
Roberto de Oliveira Campos (1917–2001), Brazilian economist and diplomat
Rosângela Rosinha Garotinho Barros Assed Matheus de Oliveira (born 1963), Brazilian politician
Ruy Barbosa de Oliveira, Brazilian writer, jurist, and politician
Solomon de Oliveyra (–1708), Dutch rabbi, poet, and philologist
Tulio de Oliveira, Brazilian bioinformatician, South African permanent resident
Simone de Oliveira (1849–1923), Portuguese singer and actress
Vanessa de Oliveira (born 1975), Brazilian author
Vinícius de Oliveira (born 1985), Brazilian actor

Footballers

Brazilian
Alfredo Ramos de Oliveira (1924–2012)
Amauri Carvalho de Oliveira (born 1980)
Anderson Luís de Abreu Oliveira (born 1988)
André Oliveira de Lima (born 1985)
Antonio Ferreira de Oliveira Junior (born 1984)
Athirson Mazzoli e Oliveira (born 1977)
Bechara Oliveira (born 1976)
Carlos Alberto de Oliveira Júnior (born 1978)
Carlos Henrique de Oliveira (born 1986)
Cícero Herbete de Oliveira Melo (born 1980)
Clodoaldo de Oliveira (born 1974)
Crizam César de Oliveira Filho (born 1967)
Denílson de Oliveira Araújo (born 1977)
Dênis Oliveira de Souza (born 1983)
Eduardo Gonçalves de Oliveira (born 1981)
Edvaldo Oliveira Chaves (born 1958)
Elias de Oliveira Rosa (born 1983)
Francismar Carioca de Oliveira (born 1984)
Gérson de Oliveira Nunes (born 1941)
Giovanni Silva de Oliveira (born 1972)
Jefferson de Oliveira Galvão (born 1983)
João Batista Nunes de Oliveira (born 1954)
Jonas Gonçalves Oliveira (born 1984)
José Ricardo dos Santos Oliveira (born 1984)
José Roberto de Oliveira (born 1980)
José Roberto Gama de Oliveira (born 1964)
Josué Anunciato de Oliveira (born 1979)
Luciano Siqueira de Oliveira (born 1975)
Luis Oliveira (born 1969)
Luiz Alberto da Silva Oliveira (born 1977)
Luíz Mesquita de Oliveira (1911–1983)
Marcelo Gonçalves de Oliveira (born 1971)
Marco Aurélio de Oliveira (born 1972)
Marcos Barbosa Oliveira (born 1976)
Marcos Rogério Oliveira Duarte (born 1985)
Malcom Filipe Silva de Oliveira (born 1997)
Nélson Oliveira  (born 1991)
Paulo Rafael de Oliveira Ramos (1985–2009)
Paulo Sérgio de Oliveira Lima (born 1954)
Pedro Paulo de Oliveira (born 1977)
Peres De Oliveira (born 1974)
Raí Souza Vieira de Oliveira (born 1965)
Reinaldo da Cruz Oliveira (born 1979)
Rogério Oliveira da Costa (1976–2006)
Ricardo Oliveira (born 1980)
Roberto Firmino Barbosa de Oliveira (born 1991)
Sócrates Brasileiro Sampaio de Souza Vieira de Oliveira (1954–2011)
Valdo Cândido de Oliveira Filho (born 1964)
Wellington Katzor de Oliveira (born 1981)
Weligton Robson Pena de Oliveira (born 1979)
Willer Souza Oliveira (born 1979)
William Machado de Oliveira (born 1976)

Other nationalities
Antonio José Conceição Oliveira "Toni" (born 1946), Portuguese footballer
António Luís Alves Ribeiro Oliveira (born 1952), Portuguese footballer
Cândido de Oliveira (1896–1958), Portuguese footballer
Carlos Manuel de Oliveira Magalhães (born 1974), Portuguese footballer
Carlos Paes de Oliveira (born 1978), Honduran footballer
Domingos José Paciência Oliveira (born 1969), known as "Domingos", Portuguese footballer
Filipe Oliveira (born 1984), Portuguese footballer
Jorge Miguel Oliveira Ribeiro (born 1981), Portuguese footballer
Nuno Ricardo Oliveira Ribeiro (born 1977), Portuguese footballer
Pedro Oliveira (born 1981), Portuguese footballer
Raúl Oliveira (born 1972), Portuguese footballer
Ruben Olivera (born 1983), Uruguayan footballer
Rui Jorge de Sousa Dias Macedo de Oliveira (born 1973), Portuguese footballer

Other sports-related
Alvimar de Oliveira Costa (born 1961), Brazilian football manager and team president
Amanda Oliveira (born 1987), Brazilian water polo player
António Luís Alves Ribeiro Oliveira (born 1952), Portuguese football manager and team president
Basil D'Oliveira (1931–2011), South African born England Test cricketer
Brett D'Oliveira (born 1992), an English cricketer
Carmem de Oliveira (born 1965), Brazilian long-distance runner
Charles Oliveira (born 1989), Brazilian mixed martial arts fighter, Current UFC Lightweight Champion
Damian D'Oliveira (1960–2014), South African cricketer
Dona Oliveira (born 1960), American female bodybuilder
Elisângela Oliveira (born 1978), Brazilian volleyball player
Gonçalo Oliveira (born 1995), Portuguese tennis player
João Carlos de Oliveira (1954–1999), Brazilian athlete
Luís Oliveira Gonçalves (born 1960), coach of the Angola national football team
Manuel de Oliveira (1940–2017), Portuguese long-distance runner
Maria Cristina de Oliveira (born 1959), Brazilian chess player
Miguel Oliveira (motorcycle racer) (born 1995), Portuguese motorcycle racer
Oswaldo de Oliveira (born 1950), Brazilian football manager and coach
Servílio de Oliveira (born 1948), Brazilian Olympic boxer
Tess Oliveira (born 1987), Brazilian water polo goalkeeper
Walewska Oliveira (born 1979), Brazilian volleyball player

Fictional characters
Carlos Oliveira, in Resident Evil 3: Nemesis
Silene Oliveira from Money Heist, also known as Tokyo

References
“Marranos and the Inquisition on the Gold Route in Minas Gerais, Brazil” in The Jews and the Expansion of Europa to the West, 1450–1800″ New York/Oxford: Bergham Books, Oxford, 2001, pp. 215–241.

Novinsky, Anita, Prisioneiros Brasileiros na Inquisição, Rio de Janeiro: Expressão e Cultura, 2001.

Salvador, J. Gonçalves. Os cristãos-Novos em Minas Gerais durante o Ciclo do Ouro. São Paulo, Pioneira, 1992.

Novinski, Anita. Inquisição, Inventários de Bens Confiscados a Cristãos-Novos no Brasil – século XVIII. Lisboa: Imprensa Nacional/Casa da Moeda, 1978, pp. 223–224.

Inquisição de Lisboa nº 6.515, Arquivo Nacional da Torre do Tombo, manuscrito. Veja BROMBERG, Raquel Mizrahi. A Inquisição no Brasil: Um capitão–mór judaisante. São Paulo: Ed. Centro Estudos Judaicos, USP, 1984.

Sobre Manoel Nunes Viana, veja “o Processo de Miguel de Mendonça Valladolid, Inquisição de Lisboa 9.973”. Lisboa, Arquivo Nacional da Torre do Tombo, manuscrito e Manuscritos não catalogados “caixa 676, século XVIII, anos 1703 –1710, 29 janeiro 1710 e caixa 83, ano 1719. Lisboa, Arquivo Histórico e Ultramarino, manuscritos.

Portuguese-language surnames
Toponymic surnames
Sephardic surnames